The Strand Theatre in Shreveport, Louisiana, United States, opened in 1925 as a Vaudeville venue and was nicknamed "The greatest theatre of the South" and the "Million Dollar Theatre" by its builders, Julian and Abraham Saenger of Shreveport, owners of the Saenger Amusements Company, which operated theaters throughout the American South and in Central America. By the 1940s it had evolved into a movie cinema, which it remained until its closure in 1977. Threatened with demolition, it was saved by a coalition of concerned citizens who restored it to its original grandeur over a nearly seven-year period. It is the "Official State Theatre of Louisiana". Since its re-opening in 1984 following restoration it has served as a performing arts venue, featuring the Shreveport Broadway Series and other traveling Off-Broadway shows.

Emile Weil and Charles G. Davis of New Orleans were the architects of the theater with interior design work by Paul Heerwagen of Arkansas. Construction foreman was Ernest Raleigh Darrow of Shreveport. The Strand was a flagship theatre for Saenger Amusements Company and its successor, Saenger-Ehrlich Enterprises, a forerunner of Paramount Pictures.

During the 1960s, when the Strand was in use as a cinema, the facility was desegregated through the efforts of the Reverend Herman Farr, who in 1978 became one of the first three African Americans to have served on the Shreveport City Council.

In 1977, the theatre was placed on the National Register of Historic Places.

See also
National Register of Historic Places listings in Caddo Parish, Louisiana

References

External links

 Official Site of the Strand Theatre

Theatres on the National Register of Historic Places in Louisiana
Buildings and structures in Shreveport, Louisiana
Culture of Shreveport, Louisiana
Emile Weil buildings
National Register of Historic Places in Caddo Parish, Louisiana
Public venues with a theatre organ
Individually listed contributing properties to historic districts on the National Register in Louisiana